Sara Rudner (born 16 February 1944) is an American dancer, choreographer and dance educator.

Life and career
Sara Rudner was born in Brooklyn, New York, and studied dance at a neighborhood music school and ballet with Bella Malinka. She graduated with a BA from Barnard College and a MFA from Bennington College. She performed with Paul Sanasardo and also other groups, and in 1965 she became a founding member and in 1966 principal dancer for Twyla Tharp's dance company, where she continued to work for twenty years. She also performed solo and collaborated other artists, including Dana Reitz, Mikhail Baryshnikov and Christopher Janney.

Rudner founded and directed the Sara Rudner Performance Ensemble, and has provided choreography for the Public Theater, the Santa Fe Opera, and the Paris Opera. She served as Director or the Dance Program at Sarah Lawrence College until 2019. Rudner continues to perform professionally to good reviews.

Honors and awards
Bessie Award
Guggenheim Memorial Foundation Fellowship
Dance Magazine award, 2009
National Endowment for the Arts fellowship
New York State Council on the Arts fellowship

Works
Selected works include:
Dancing-on-View
Heartbeat
33 Dances
Dancing-on-View: Preview/Hindsight

References

External links

1944 births
Living people
Modern dancers
Barnard College alumni
Contemporary dance choreographers
American female dancers
American dancers
National Endowment for the Arts Fellows
Bessie Award winners
21st-century American women
Sarah Lawrence College faculty